Euseius orcula is a species of mite in the family Phytoseiidae.

References

orcula
Articles created by Qbugbot
Animals described in 1992